The Minister for Rural Affairs (formally cabinet minister and head of the Ministry for Rural Affairs and prior to that Minister of Agriculture) is a position in the Government of Sweden since November 2021 and previously from 1900 to July 2021. It was merged into the office of Minister for Business, Industry and Innovation in July 2021 but was re-established in November 2021 by newly appointed Prime Minister Magdalena Andersson. It was also kept after the government shift due to the 2022 Swedish general election, when current minister Peter Kullgren (kd) was appointed. 

The officeholder was a member and minister of the Swedish Government and appointed by the Prime Minister. The minister headed the Ministry for Rural Affairs until 2014, when the office was placed under the Ministry of Enterprise. The officeholder was responsible for agriculture and environmental issues relating to agriculture, fishery, reindeer husbandry, Sami affairs, horticulture, animal welfare, foodstuffs, hunting and game management, as well as higher education and research in the field of agricultural sciences.

History
The office was founded in 1900 under the name of Minister of Agriculture, and its first holder was Theodor Odelberg. The title was renamed Minister for Rural Affairs in 2010.

List of Ministers of Agriculture (1900–2010)

List of Ministers for Rural Affairs (2010–2021)

List of Ministers with responsibility for rural affairs (2021)

List of Ministers for Rural Affairs (2021–) 

Government ministers of Sweden